Dimitris Markos (born 31 January 1971) is a Greek former professional footballer who played as a midfielder. He now works as a scout for OFI.

Club career
Markos started his football career in 1987 at Naoussa, where he played for five seasons before joining Panathinaikos in 1992. He gradually established himself as a first-team player for five years, won 3 championships, 3 Greek Cups and 2 Super Cups including a double in 1995 and at the same time he became an international. He a member of the team that reached the semi-finals of the UEFA Champions League in 1996, scoring in the decisive away win against Porto.

In the summer of 1997 he moved to England for Sheffield United, where he failed to compete in any game and after a few months he returned to Greece to play for the second division side, Kalamata. The people of AEK Athens noticed that he was by no means finished as a footballer and decided to sign him in the summer of 1998. He was a regular in the midfield of the team and with his presence helped the club a lot for two seasons. On 10 May 2000 he won the cup, even though staying on the bench throughout the final against Ionikos. After leaving AEK he signed for Aris, where he played for 2 seasons. In 2002 he moved to their rivals, PAOK where he played for 3 seasons before retiring, winning yet another cup on 17 May 2003, playing the full match against his former club.

International career
Markos was first called to play with Greece in 1992 and made 17 appearances scoring 1 goal until 1999.

After football
In 2005 he returned to AEK for a few years as a team scout. In 2013 was also a scout at the Panathinaikos academies. Since 2018, he works as a scout for OFI.

Honours

Panathinaikos
Alpha Ethniki: 1994–95, 1995–96
Greek Cup: 1992–93, 1993–94, 1994–95
Greek Super Cup: 1993, 1994

AEK Athens
Greek Cup: 1999–2000

PAOK
Greek Cup: 2002–03

References

External links

1971 births
Living people
Greek footballers
Footballers from Kilkis
Greece international footballers
Greek expatriate footballers
Association football midfielders
AEK Athens F.C. players
Panathinaikos F.C. players
PAOK FC players
Naoussa F.C. players
Sheffield United F.C. players
Kalamata F.C. players
Super League Greece players
Expatriate footballers in England
AEK F.C. non-playing staff
Panathinaikos F.C. non-playing staff
Aris Thessaloniki F.C. players